Alikua Pyramid is a vandalised 5 metre high, conical, stone and mud structure build by the Belgian colonialists in Alikua Village, Yivu Subcounty, Maracha during 1911. Two Belgians are buried under the Pyramid at Alikua including Captain Von Kirkhoven.

Point of interest
Located in Maracha District, west of the Arua-Koboko Highway, about half an hour drive from Arua, this pyramid is a cultural heritage that could be used to promote tourism in West Nile. The Belgians built it to signify that they were the first foreigners to settle there. But after signing the 1911 Agreement, it was heavily guarded by British Protectorate soldiers since West Nile had been transferred to British colonialists.

References

Arua District
Buildings and structures in Uganda
Pyramids